Dwina may refer to:

Northern Dvina, a river in the Vologda and Arkhangelsk Oblasts, Russia
Western Dvina or Daugava, a river in Russia, Belarus and Latvia
Dwina, Virginia, a community in Wise County, Virginia